Marshal of the Royal Air Force (MRAF) is the highest rank in the Royal Air Force (RAF). In peacetime it was granted to RAF officers in the appointment of Chief of the Defence Staff (CDS), and to retired Chiefs of the Air Staff (CAS), who were promoted to it on their last day of service. While surviving Marshals of the RAF retain the rank for life, the highest rank to which officers on active service are promoted is now air chief marshal. Although general promotions to Marshal of the Royal Air Force have been discontinued since the British defence cuts of the 1990s, further promotions to the rank may still be made in wartime, for members of the Royal Family and certain very senior RAF air officers in peacetime at the discretion of the monarch; all such promotions in peacetime are only honorary, however. In 2012, the then Prince of Wales was promoted to the rank in recognition of his support for his mother, Queen Elizabeth II, in her capacity as head of the armed forces (commander-in-chief), while in 2014 Lord Stirrup, who had served as Chief of the Air Staff and Chief of the Defence Staff for over seven years, was also promoted.

Marshal of the Royal Air Force is a five-star rank and unlike the air marshal ranks, can properly be considered a marshal rank. MRAF has a NATO ranking code of OF-10, equivalent to an admiral of the fleet in the Royal Navy or a field marshal in the British Army.

The rank was instituted in 1919 and the first officer to be promoted to MRAF was Sir Hugh Trenchard in 1927. Since that time, including Trenchard, there have been 27 men who have held the rank. Of those, 22 have been professional RAF officers and five have been senior members of the British Royal Family. King George V did not formally hold the rank of marshal of the RAF; rather he assumed the title of Chief of the Royal Air Force. In this capacity from time to time he wore RAF uniform with the rank insignia of a marshal of the RAF. He first publicly wore such uniform in 1935, the year before his death.

Excluding monarchs and other members of the Royal Family, the only two RAF officers ever to have held the rank without serving as Chief of the Air Staff were Lord Douglas of Kirtleside and Sir Arthur Harris. Both held high command during the Second World War. Harris was Air Officer Commanding-in-Chief Bomber Command and Douglas was Air Officer Commanding-in-Chief Fighter Command, Middle East Command and Coastal Command.

Origins
Prior to the creation of the RAF's officer rank titles in 1919, it was proposed that by analogy with field marshal, the highest rank title should be air marshal. It was later decided to use the rank of air marshal as an equivalent rank to lieutenant general and "marshal of the air" was put forward as the highest RAF rank. This new rank title was opposed by the then Chief of the Imperial General Staff, Sir Henry Wilson, who considered that the title was "ridiculous". However, the Chief of the Air Staff, Sir Hugh Trenchard was unmoved and the title was adopted. Though never held by a Royal Air Force officer, the rank title of marshal of the air lasted until April 1925, when it was changed to marshal of the Royal Air Force. Questioned in the House of Commons, Secretary of State for Air Sir Samuel Hoare stated that the reason for the change in title was that marshal of the air was "somewhat indefinite in character" and the new title was deemed more appropriate. It has also been reported that King George V was not happy with the title of marshal of the air, feeling it might imply attributes which should properly be reserved for God.

Insignia, command flag and star plate
The rank insignia consists of four narrow light blue bands (each on a slightly wider black band) above a light blue band on a broad black band. This insignia is derived from the sleeve lace of an admiral of the fleet and is worn on both the lower sleeves of the tunic or on the shoulders of the flying suit or the service working dress uniform. Marshals of the Royal Air Force wear shoulder boards with their service dress at ceremonial events. These shoulder boards show the air officer's eagle surrounded by a wreath, two crossed marshal's batons and, since the coronation of Queen Elizabeth II, the St Edward's Crown representing royal authority. Prior to 1953, the Tudor Crown (sometimes called the King's Crown) was used.

The command flag of a marshal of the Royal Air Force has a broad red horizontal band in the centre with a thinner red band on each side of it.

The vehicle star plate for a marshal of the Royal Air Force depicts five white stars (marshal of the Royal Air Force is equivalent to a five-star rank) on an air force blue background.

The rank insignia and flag exists in some other air forces for equivalent ranks. The rank title differs slightly, often being a variation on marshal of the air force, usually with the name of the relevant air force in place of the words 'Royal Air Force'.  A notable example of this practice is the rank of marshal of the Royal Australian Air Force.

Marshals of the Royal Air Force 

Unlike other MRAFs who only relinquished their appointments, Sir Peter Harding resigned from the RAF in 1994. Consequently, his name was removed from the Air Force List, but it was later reinstated.

See also

 Air force officer rank insignia
 British and U.S. military ranks compared
 Comparative military ranks
 General of the air force
 List of Royal Air Force air chief marshals
 Marshal of the air force
 RAF officer ranks

References

External links 
 

Military ranks of the Royal Air Force
 
Air force ranks